Jobson's Luck is a 1913 British comedy film, directed by H.O. Martinek and starring George Foley, Hal Charlton and M. Gray Murray.

Cast
 George Foley - Jobson
 Hal Charlton - Gilbert Fanshawe
 M. Gray Murray - Mr. Fanshawe
 Violet Graham - Girl
 Lettie Paxton - Girl

References

External links

1913 films
1913 comedy films
British silent short films
British comedy films
British black-and-white films
1910s English-language films
1910s British films
Silent comedy films